The 2007–08 DFB-Pokal was the 65th season of the annual German football cup competition. 64 teams competed in the tournament of six rounds which began on 3 August 2007 and ended on 19 April 2008. In the final FC Bayern Munich defeated Borussia Dortmund 2–1 after extra time, thereby claiming their fourteenth title.

Matches

First round

Second round

Round of 16

Quarter-finals

Semi-finals

Final

References

External links
 Official site of the DFB 
 Kicker.de 

2007-08
2007–08 in German football cups